P103 may refer to:

 , a patrol boat of the Mexican Navy
 , a patrol boat of the Dominican Navy
 Papyrus 103, a biblical manuscript
 P103, a state regional road in Latvia